The October Cherries were a late 1960s group from Singapore. The group was originally known as the Surfers, but changed their name to The October Cherries in 1968. They were influenced by The Beatles, and were popular in Malaysia and the Netherlands.

Songs with strong psychedelic backgrounds included "Lay Down Your Love", "Dreamseller" and "Felicia". Their single "All Things Work Together (For Good to Them That Love God)" peaked at number 96 in Australia in January 1972.

References

External links
 October Cherries

Psychedelic rock music groups
Singaporean rock music groups
Beat groups
Bellaphon Records artists